The Aero HC-2 Heli Baby is a two-seat general-purpose light utility helicopter, designed by engineer Jaroslav Šlechta, and produced by the Czechoslovak company Aero Vodochody in the 1950s. It has a three-blade main rotor, and a two-blade tail rotor. The helicopter has an entirely metal frame and cockpit, and windows made of Plexiglas. It was the first and the only Czechoslovak-designed helicopter to be produced.

Design and development
The helicopter was designed by engineer Jaroslav Šlechta. Construction of the prototype began in 1951, and testing commenced in 1954. The first flight occurred on December 3, 1954, and the helicopter was introduced to the public in 1955 at the Brno Industries Fair. Production was slated to begin in 1957, however, engine problems delayed it. The initial run produced 200 of these helicopters. The Czechoslovak Air Force was a user of the HC-2, as was the Czechoslovak People's Army. The Heli Baby is capable of carrying a pilot and 220 pounds of cargo at the speed of 62 mph, while using 4.85 gallons of fuel. In 1959, it was one of the world's lightest two-seated helicopters. Initially powered by an  Praga DH engine, the more powerful  Avia M 110H engine, designed specifically for use in helicopters, replaced it after approximately six years. The Heli Baby can be used for transport, training, and various "other duties in military and civil service". Cargo space is situated behind the helicopter's two seats. The non-retractable undercarriage has three wheels in a tricycle configuration.

Operators

Czechoslovak Air Force

Specifications

References

Notes

Bibliography
Beneš, Ladislav. (In Czech) Československé vrtulníky známé i neznámé. Votobia, 1998. .

1950s Czechoslovakian civil utility aircraft
1950s Czechoslovakian helicopters
HC-2
Aircraft first flown in 1954
Single-engined piston helicopters